Saint Methodius may refer to:

 Saint Methodius of Olympus (d. 311), Christian bishop, church father, and martyr
 Saint Methodios I of Constantinople (c. 790–847), patriarch of Constantinople
 Saint Methodius of Thessaloniki (826–885), Byzantine Greek archbishop of Moravia and scholar

See also
 Methodius (disambiguation)